This article is a list of notable encyclopedic persons, students, alumni, faculty, and academic affiliates associated with Santa Clara University in Santa Clara, California United States.

University presidents

John Nobili, S.J., 1851–56
Nicholas Congiato, S.J., 1856–57
Felix Cicaterri, S.J., 1857–61
Burchard Villiger, S.J., 1861–65
Aloysius Masnata, S.J., 1865–68
Aloysius Varsi, S.J., 1868–76
Aloysius Brunengo, S.J., 1876–80
John Pinasco, S.J., 1880–83
Robert E. Kenna, S.J., 1883–88
John Pinasco, S.J. 1888–93
Joseph W. Riordan, S.J. 1893–99
Robert E. Kenna, S.J., 1899–1905
Richard A. Gleeson, S.J., 1905–10
James P. Morrissey, S.J., 1910–13
Walter F. Thornton, S.J., 1913–18
Timothy L. Murphy, S.J., 1918–21
Zacheus J. Maher, S.J., 1921–26
Cornelius J. McCoy, S.J., 1926–32
James J. Lyons, S.J., 1932–35
Louis C. Rudolph, S.J. 1935–40
Charles J. Walsh, S.J., 1940–45
William C. Gianera, S.J. 1945–51
Herman J. Hauck, S.J. 1951–58
Patrick A. Donahoe, S.J. 1958–68
Thomas D. Terry, S.J. 1968–76
William J. Rewak. S.J. 1976–88
Paul L. Locatelli, S.J. 1988–2008
Michael Engh, S.J. January 5, 2009 – 2019
Kevin O'Brien, S.J. 2019–2021
Lisa A. Kloppenberg, 2021–2022
Julie Sullivan, 2022–present

Board of Trustees

 Mike Carey, President of Seirus Gloves and Accessories and Head Referee for the NFL
 David C. Drummond, VP Corporate Development and Chief Counsel, Google
 Jack D. Kuehler, retired President of IBM Corporation
 Paul L. Locatelli, S.J., former University President
 Rupert H. Johnson, Jr., Vice Chairman of Franklin Resources, Inc.
 J. Terrence "Terry" Lanni, CEO and chairman of the board at MGM Mirage, Las Vegas
 Lorry I. Lokey, President/owner of Business Wire
 A.C. (Mike) Markkula, owner of A.C.M. Investments and co-founder of Apple Computer
 Regis McKenna, Chairman of The McKenna Group
 Edward A. Panelli (1955), Chairman Emeritus of Judicial, Arbitration and Mediation Services
 Leon Panetta, Director of Panetta Institute for Public Policy at the California State University, Monterey Bay
 John A. Sobrato, Chairman of Sobrato Development Companies
 Larry W. Sonsini, chairman and CEO of Wilson Sonsini Goodrich & Rosati

Notable alumni

Academics

Academia
 Wenona Giles, academic, fellow of the Royal Society of Canada
 Paul Locatelli S.J. (1960), former Secretary of Jesuit Education for the Society of Jesus and former president of Santa Clara University
 Mary Ann Peters (1972), Provost of the Naval War College
Vincent Price (1979), 10th and Current President of Duke University
 James V. Schall, S.J. Professor at Georgetown University
 Brian Swimme, cosmologist at CIIS

 Osei Appiah, Professor, Communications, The Ohio State University

Engineering
 Frank Cepollina, inventor, National Inventors Hall of Fame, Deputy Associate Director, NASA's Hubble Space Telescope Development Project at NASA's Goddard Space Flight Center
 Brendan Eich, B.Sc. c. 1983, creator of JavaScript, Chief Technology Officer of the Mozilla Corporation
 Robert Freitas, (PhD), nanotechnology pioneer and legal scholar
 Chris Malachowsky, M.S., co-founder of NVIDIA
 John T. "Jack" Mullin (1936), pioneer of early magnetic tape recording technology and founder of the laugh track
 Boris Murmann, M.S., Professor of Electrical Engineering at Stanford University.

Science
 David Merritt (1977), astrophysicist at the Rochester Institute of Technology

Arts and literature

Artists

 Ernest de Saisset, early Californian artist
 Andrew P. Hill, artist and prominent conservationist responsible for the creation of the California State Park System and Big Basin Redwoods State Park
 Manuel Valencia, early California landscape painter

Film and television

 Andy Ackerman (1978), producer and director, Seinfeld
 Michelle Ashford (1983), Emmy-nominated screenwriter, The Pacific
 Lloyd Bacon, early Hollywood director, Knute Rockne, All American
 Max Baer, Jr., actor and film producer
 John Bailey, director and cinematographer
 Darren Brazil (2007), three-time Emmy Award-winning editor, producer and videographer
 Hank Cheyne (1980), actor
 Jackie Coogan, actor (dropped out)
 Andy Devine, Western character actor
 Bill Duggan, actor
 Nina Garbiras, actress
 Julie Garnyé, actress
 Clay M. Greene (1869), playwright
 Paul Hoen, director and producer
 Jerry Howarth (1968), radio broadcaster for the Toronto Blue Jays
 Neal Jimenez (1982), movie screenwriter and director
 Sabira Khan, producer
 Ron Lagomarsino (1973), movie, stage, and TV director, My Sister's Keeper, Joan of Arcadia, Driving Miss Daisy
 Mary Mazur (1979), television producer, American Family, Vice President of KCET
 Sandra McCoy, actress
 Shemar Moore (1992), actor and host
 Alex Nesic, actor
 Barry O'Brien (1979), television writer and producer of Hanging with Mr. Cooper and CSI Miami
 Julie Payne, actress
 Mary Richardson (1968), co-anchor of Boston's WCVB-TV's Chronicle, the nation's longest-running, locally produced nightly news magazine
 Kurtwood Smith (1968), actor; "Red" from That '70s Show
 Adam Zotovich (1997), Broadway producer of The Color Purple, The Addams Family, View From the Bridge
Michael Trucco, actor

Journalism
 Jeff Brazil (1985), Pulitzer Prize-winning journalist, Orlando Sentinel
 Lawrence A. Fernsworth, journalist and author
 Michael Malone, journalist, author and former editor of Forbes ASAP
 Charles K. McClatchy (1901), former editor of the Sacramento Bee and co-owner of the McClatchy Company
 Valentine S. McClatchy (1879), former editor of the Sacramento Bee and co-owner of the McClatchy Company
 Gordon Young (journalist), journalist and author

Music
 Thomas Buckner (1964), baritone vocalist
 Kym Campbell, Australian singer-songwriter
 Susan Gundunas, soprano opera vocalist
 Paul Kantner (1959–1961), guitarist, singer, and co-founder of Jefferson Airplane and Jefferson Starship (dropped out)
 Jorma Kaukonen, guitarist of Jefferson Airplane
 Lil Rob,  Mexican American rapper, producer, and actor
 Anthony Lun, songwriter, arranger, musical director and singer
 Anya Marina, singer-songwriter
 Anthony Quartuccio (1987), music director of West Coast Lyric Opera
 Kevin Waters (1965), composer, Jesuit priest, educator

Writers
 Everett Alvarez, author
 Reza Aslan (1995), Iranian-American scholar and author of No god but God
 Gina M. Biegel (M.A. 2005), author and psychotherapist
 James Billmaier (1977), author
 Lewis Buzbee (1979), author
 James W. Douglass (1960), author and activist
 Lawrence A. Fernsworth (1914), author and journalist
 Robert Freitas, author
 Ron Hansen, author, The Assassination of Jesse James by the Coward Robert Ford
 Khaled Hosseini (1988), international bestselling author of the nationally best-selling novels The Kite Runner and A Thousand Splendid Suns
 Francisco Jimenez (1966), author and educator
 Holly Kearl (2005), author
 Robert Kinerk, author, journalist and playwright
 Bob LaMonte, NFL agent and author of Winning the NFL Way, Leadership Lessons from Some of the NFL's Top Head Coaches
 Michael Malone (M.B.A. 1977), author and former editor of Forbes ASAP
 Tom McEnery, author
 William McKnight (M.B.A. 1994), author and businessman
 Kelly Moore, New York Times bestselling author of Deadly Medicine and Amber House
 Dee Dee Myers, author and political commentator
 Paul C. Paquet (1970), author and biologist
 James V. Schall, writer, philosopher, priest, and educator
 Sherrie Gong Taguchi, author

Justices

U.S. State and Territorial Supreme Court Justices

 Robert D. Durham (J.D. 1972), Associate Justice of Oregon Supreme Court
 William G. Lorigan (Ph.D. 1903), Justice of the Supreme Court of California
 Edward A. Panelli (1953), (J.D. 1955), Chief Justice of Supreme Court of California
 Douglas Moylan, Judge on Guam's Supreme Court

U.S. State Ninth Circuit and Court of Appeal Justices

 Martin J. Jenkins (1977), Justice of the California Court of Appeal for the First District, former federal Judge of the United States District Court for the Northern District of California
 William R. McGuiness (1968), Presiding Justice of the California Court of Appeal First District
 Edward A. Panelli (J.D. 1955), former Justice of the California Court of Appeal Sixth District and retired Chief Justice of Supreme Court of California
 Charles Poochigian (J.D. 1975), Associate Justice, California Court of Appeal Fifth District
 Eugene M. Premo (J.D. 1962), Associate Justice of the California Court of Appeal 6th District
 Richard C. Tallman (1975), Federal Justice for the United States Court of Appeals for the Ninth Circuit
 Thomas Tang (1947), Senior Federal Justice for the United States Court of Appeals for the Ninth Circuit and first Chinese American appointed to the Federal Judiciary
 William Thorne (1974), Justice of the Utah Court of Appeals

U.S. Federal District Court Judges

 Samuel Conti, Judge, U.S. District Court
 Phyllis Hamilton (1976), Judge, United States District Court for the Northern District of California
 Martin J. Jenkins (1977), former federal Judge of the United States District Court for the Northern District of California
 Eugene Lynch (1953), Judge, United States District Court for the Northern District of California
 James Francis Smith (1878), Federal Justice for the United States Court of Customs and Patent Appeals

U.S. State Judges

 Alfred Delucchi (J.D. 1960), Judge, Alameda Superior Court, and judge that Presided over Scott Peterson trial
 Francis Devaney (1983), Judge, San Diego County Superior Court
 Eugene Michael Hyman (J.D. 1977), Judge, Santa Clara County Superior Court
 Lawrence Terry (1957), Judge, Santa Clara County Superior Court
 Mark Thomas (1956), Judge, Santa Clara County Superior Court

Entrepreneurs and business leaders
 Everett Alvarez (1960), President of Conwal Consulting
 William Dallas (1987), founder and owner, Dallas Capital
 Pansy Ho (1985), managing director Shun Tak Holdings and Sociedade de Turismo e Diversões de Macau 
 David Drummond (1985), Vice President and General Counsel, Google
 Fred Franzia (1965), owner of Bronco Winery and maker of Charles Shaw wine, potentially the largest grape producer in California
 Pat Gelsinger (1983), CEO of VMware and incoming CEO of Intel
 Richard Justice (1971), Executive Vice President World Wide Field Operations, Cisco Systems
 Jack Kuehler (1954), former President of IBM
 Thomas Lavelle (1976), Senior Vice President, General Counsel, Rambus
 Thomas E. Leavey (1922), co-founder of Farmers Insurance
 Chris Malachowsky (M.S. 1986), co-founder and Senior Vice President of Engineering and Operations, NVIDIA
 Peter Oppenheimer (M.B.A. 1987), CFO and Senior Vice President of Apple Computer
 George Reyes (M.B.A 1979), CFO, and former Senior Vice President, Google
 Stephen Schott (1960), former owner of the Oakland Athletics
 John A. Sobrato (1960), billionaire owner and chairman, Sobrato Development Companies
 Thomas D. Terry (S.J.), President of Novitiate Wines

Politics and government

Cabinet members
 Mike Espy (J.D. 1978), 25th U.S. Secretary of Agriculture and first African-American Secretary of Agriculture and  member of the United States House of Representatives
 Dee Dee Myers (1983), 20th White House Press Secretary
 Janet Napolitano (1979), 3rd United States Secretary of Homeland Security (under President Barack Obama), 21st Governor of Arizona and 23rd Attorney General of Arizona
 Leon Panetta (1960), 23rd United States Secretary of Defense, 21st Director of the CIA, former U.S. Congressman, 29th Director of the Office of Management and Budget, 18th White House Chief of Staff, Chair of the United States House Committee on the Budget

United States Senators
 Paul Laxalt (J.D.), former U.S. Senator from Nevada, 22nd Governor of Nevada and 23rd Lieutenant Governor of Nevada
 Frank Murkowski (1955), former U.S. Senator from Alaska and 8th Governor of Alaska
 Stephen Mallory White (1871), former U.S. Senator from California, member of California State Senate as president pro tempore

Members of the U.S. House of Representatives
 John H. Burke, member of the United States House of Representatives
 Mike Espy (J.D. 1978), member of the United States House of Representatives, 25th U.S. Secretary of Agriculture and first African-American Secretary of Agriculture
 Cecil R. King, former member of Congress, California (fourteen terms)
 Robert J. Lagomarsino (J.D.1953), former member of the United States House of Representatives and former member of California State Senate
 Zoe Lofgren (J.D. 1975), member of the United States House of Representatives and Chairman of the House Ethics Committee
 Leon Panetta (1960), former member of the United States House of Representatives, 21st and Current Director of the CIA, 29th Director of the Office of Management and Budget, 18th White House Chief of Staff, Chairperson of the United States House Committee on the Budget
 Howard Wallace Pollock, former member of the United States House of Representatives
 William Howard Royer, former member of the United States House of Representatives

Governors
 Gavin Newsom (1989), 40th (current) Governor of California, 49th Lieutenant Governor of California and 42nd Mayor of San Francisco
 Jerry Brown (1959), 34th and 39th Governor of California, 31st Attorney General of California, 44th Mayor of Oakland and 24th Secretary of State of California
 Paul Laxalt (J.D.), 22nd Governor of Nevada, former U.S. Senator from Nevada, and 23rd Lieutenant Governor of Nevada
 Bob Miller (1967), 26th Governor of Nevada and 29th Lieutenant Governor of Nevada
 Frank Murkowski (1955), 8th Governor of Alaska and United States Senator for Alaska
 Janet Napolitano (1979), 21st Governor of Arizona, 3rd United States Secretary of Homeland Security, and 23rd Attorney General of Arizona

Lieutenant Governors
 Paul Laxalt (J.D.), 23rd Lieutenant Governor of Nevada and former U.S. Senator from Nevada and 22nd Governor of Nevada
 Bob Miller (1967), 29th Lieutenant Governor of Nevada and 26th Governor of Nevada
 Gavin Newsom (1989), 49th Lieutenant Governor of California and 42nd Mayor of San Francisco

U.S. statewide officials

 Jerry Brown (1959), 31st Attorney General of California, 34th and 39th Governor of California, 44th Mayor of Oakland and 24th Secretary of State of California
 David C. Long (J.D.), Indiana State Senator, President Pro Tempore and chair for Rules & Legislative Procedure
 Janet Napolitano (1979), 23rd Attorney General of Arizona, 3rd and current United States Secretary of Homeland Security, and 21st Governor of Arizona
 Leon Panetta (1960), 29th Director of the Office of Management and Budget, 21st and Current Director of the CIA, former U.S. Congressman, 18th White House Chief of Staff, Chairperson of the United States House Committee on the Budget
 Charles Poochigian (J.D. 1975), former California State Senator
 Curren Price (J.D.), California State Senator, member of the California State Assembly, and City Councilman
 Gregory P. Schmidt (1968), Secretary of the California State Senate
 Augustus D. Splivalo (1859), former California treasurer
 John Vasconcellos, California State Senator and member of the California State Assembly
 Heidi Gansert, Nevada State Senator and member of the Nevada Assembly.

Other U.S. political officials
 Richard Bissen, Mayor of Maui County, Hawaii
 Benjamin J. Cruz (1975), Chief Justice of the Supreme Court of Guam, Attorney General on Guam's Superior Court, Secretary General, Vice President, and Treasurer of Guam National Olympic Committee
 Anthony P. Hamann (1932), former City Manager of San Jose, California
 Arthur Hull Hayes, former FDA Commissioner, doctor, first SCU Rhodes Scholar
 Arturo Jaramillo (1975), Head of Regulation and Licensing Department for the State of California
 Patricia Mahan (J.D. 1980), Mayor of Santa Clara
 Tom McEnery (M.A. 1967), 61st Mayor of San Jose, California
 R. Burnett Miller, Mayor of Sacramento, California
 Gavin Newsom (1989), 42nd Mayor of San Francisco, California
 Gary Podesto (1963), former Mayor of Stockton
 Richard Riordan (1952), 39th Mayor of Los Angeles
 Albert J. Ruffo (1936), 48th Mayor of San Jose
 Anthony Williams (1973), 5th Mayor of Washington, D.C.
 McGregor W. Scott, Current U.S. Attorney for the Eastern District of California

Other non-U.S. political officials
 Yukiwo P. Dengokl, member of the Senate of Palau
 Jamby Madrigal (B.S. Economics), member of the Senate of the Philippines
 José Abad Santos (Pre-Law 1905), 5th Chief Justice of the Supreme Court of the Philippines, Associate Justice of the Supreme Court of the Philippines and Secretary of Justice

Public service
 Gordon Belcourt, former executive director of the Montana-Wyoming Tribal Leaders Council
 Elizabeth Birch (1985), executive director of Human Rights Campaign

Other
 Eileen Kato (J.D. 1980), Special Assistant to the U.S. Attorney for Western Washington District and former President of the Washington State District and Municipal Judges Association
 Murlene Randle (J.D. 1980), Director of the Office of Criminal Justice for San Francisco

Military

 Eugene M. Premo (1957), First Lieutenant in the United States Army Counterintelligence Corps.
 Eldon Regua (1977), Major general, United States Army Reserve; Commanding General, 75th Division
 James Francis Smith (1878), Brigadier General, United States Army; Governor-General of Philippine Islands
 Charles E. Stanton, military colonel and aid to General John J. Pershing in World War I; coined the phrase "Lafayette, we are here!" which was initially attributed to Pershing

Other
 Brooke Hart, murder victim
 Fred Franzia, winemaker
 Dan Kaminsky, computer security researcher
 Selina Kuruleca, Fijian psychotherapist and public commentator
 James Pike, controversial Episcopal bishop

Athletes

Baseball
 Frank Arellanes, professional MLB baseball player, pitcher for the Boston Red Sox and commonly believed to be the first Mexican American to play in the American League
 Hardin Barry, MLB player, pitcher for Oakland Athletics
 Wayne Belardi, MLB player, first baseman for the Brooklyn Dodgers and Detroit Tigers
 Lou Berberet, MLB player, New York Yankees, Washington Senators, Boston Red Sox, and Detroit Tigers
 John Boccabella, MLB player, Chicago Cubs
 Bruce Bochte, MLB player, former MLB all-star and player for the California Angels, Cleveland Indians, Seattle Mariners, and Oakland Athletics
 Nelson Briles, MLB player,  Kansas City Royals, Pittsburgh Pirates, Texas Rangers, and St. Louis Cardinals
 Al Carson, MLB player, Chicago Cubs
 Hal Chase, MLB player, first baseman for the New York Yankees, Chicago White Sox, Cincinnati Reds, New York Giants manager of New York Yankees and named on the 100 Greatest Baseball Players of All Time
 Scott Chiamparino, MLB player, pitcher for the Texas Rangers
 Victor Cole, MLB player, pitcher for the Milwaukee Brewers, San Diego Padres, Pittsburgh Pirates, and Russia national baseball team
 Mike Crudale, MLB player, St. Louis Cardinals and Milwaukee Brewers
 Tim Cullen, MLB player, Texas Rangers, Chicago White Sox and Oakland Athletics
 Jan Dukes, MLB player, pitcher for the Texas Rangers
 Ernie Fazio, MLB player, Houston Colt 45s
 Justin Fitzgerald, MLB player, New York Yankees and Philadelphia Phillies
 Mike Frank, MLB player, Cincinnati Reds and New York Yankees
 Al Gallagher, MLB player, baseball player, San Francisco Giants
 Bob Garibaldi, MLB player, San Francisco Giants and College World Series Most Outstanding Player
 Ed Giovanola, MLB player, 1995 World Series Champion, played for the Atlanta Braves and San Diego Padres
 Greg Gohr, MLB player, pitcher for the Detroit Tigers and LA Angels
 Charlie Graham, MLB player, Boston Red Sox
 Nelson Hawks, MLB player, New York Yankees and Philadelphia Phillies
 Willie Hogan, MLB player, Oakland Athletics and St. Louis Browns
 Pat Jacquez, MLB player, Chicago White Sox
 Erv Kantlehner, MLB player, Pittsburgh Pirates and Philadelphia Phillies
 Bobby Keefe, MLB player, New York Yankees and Cincinnati Reds
 Earl Kunz, MLB player, Pittsburgh Pirates
 Pat Larkin, MLB player, San Francisco Giants
 Duane Larson, scout for the Atlanta Braves
 Bill Lawrence, MLB player, Detroit Tigers
 Bevo LeBourveau, MLB player, Philadelphia Phillies
 Larry Loughlin, MLB player, Philadelphia Phillies
 Mike Macfarlane, MLB player, Boston Red Sox, Kansas City Royals, and Oakland Athletics; former ESPN analyst (local broadcaster)
 Pete Magrini, MLB player, Boston Red Sox
 Jim Mangan, MLB player, catcher for the Pittsburgh Pirates and New York Giants
 Fran Mullins, MLB player, Chicago White Sox, San Francisco Giants and Cleveland Indians
 Daniel Nava, MLB player, Boston Red Sox
 Jimmy O'Connell, MLB player, New York Giants
 Jim O'Rourke, MLB player, St. Louis Cardinals
 Marv Owen, MLB player, Detroit Tigers, Chicago White Sox, and Boston Red Sox
 Duane Pillette, MLB player, New York Yankees and Philadelphia Phillies
 Bill Renna, MLB player, New York Yankees and Boston Red Sox
 Dino Restelli, MLB player, Pittsburgh Pirates
 Rich Robertson, MLB player, San Francisco Giants
 Roger Samuels, MLB player, San Francisco Giants and Pittsburgh Pirates
 John Savage, UCLA Bruins baseball head coach
 Frank Shellenback, MLB player, pitcher for the Chicago White Sox, pitching coach for St. Louis Browns, Red Sox, Detroit Tigers, and New York Giants; elected to Pacific Coast League Hall of Fame; has most wins in Pacific Coast League history
 Bob Spence, MLB player, Chicago White Sox
 Elmer Stricklett, MLB player, pitcher for the Chicago White Sox and LA Dodgers
 Rich Troedson, MLB player, San Diego Padres
 Jim Wilhelm, MLB player, San Diego Padres
 Randy Winn, MLB player, San Francisco Giants and 2002 Major League Baseball All-Star Game
 Harry Wolter, MLB player, Cincinnati Reds, Pittsburgh Pirates, St. Louis Cardinals, Boston Red Sox, New York Yankees, Chicago Cubs

Basketball
 Dennis Awtrey (1970), former professional basketball player for the Philadelphia 76ers, Phoenix Suns, and Seattle SuperSonics
 Bill Duffy
 Bob Feerick
 Bob Garibaldi
 Marlon Garnett, former National Basketball Association player
 Brendan Graves
 Bruce Hale
 Bob Heaney
 Brian Jones
 Harold Keeling
 Mark McNamara
 Steve Nash (1996), National Basketball Association player; 2005, 2006 NBA MVP
 Dick O'Keefe
 Bud Ogden
 Ralph Ogden
 Marty Passaglia
 Stan Patrick
 Kurt Rambis (1980), National Basketball Association player; NBA champion with the Los Angeles Lakers; current Assistant Coach of the Los Angeles Lakers
 Steve Ross
 Uwe Sauer
 Kenny Sears, former professional basketball player, New York Knicks and San Francisco Warriors, first basketball player to appear on the cover of Sports Illustrated magazine
 Mike Stewart
 Nick Vanos
 Jalen Williams
 Brandin Podziemski

American football
Santa Clara University has had a number of notable American football players. The following list includes former Santa Clara University football players who have become professional players.  On February 2, 1993, the university announced its discontinuation of American football.

 Lee Artoe, NFL offensive tackle for Chicago Bears, Los Angeles Dons and Indianapolis Colts
 Roy Baker, NFL running back for Green Bay Packers
 Bryan Barker, NFL punter for St. Louis Rams
 Dick Bassi, NFL offensive guard and linebacker for Chicago Bears, Philadelphia Eagles, Pittsburgh Steelers and San Francisco 49ers
 Alyn Beals, NFL defensive end for San Francisco 49ers
 Mike Carey (1971), NFL official and owner of Seirus Innovation
 Ted Connolly, NFL offensive guard for San Francisco 49ers and Cleveland Browns
 Frank Cope, NFL offensive tackle and defensive tackle for New York Giants
 Doug Cosbie, NFL tight end for Dallas Cowboys, Three-Time Pro-Bowler
 Phil Dougherty, NFL center and linebacker for Chicago Cardinals
 Nello Falaschi, NFL running back and linebacker for New York Giants
 Tom Fears, NFL end for Los Angeles Rams
 Jesse Freitas
 Mike Garzoni, NFL offensive guard and defensive guard for Washington Redskins and New York Giants
 Visco Grgich, NFL offensive guard, offensive tackle, defensive guard and linebacker for San Francisco 49ers
 Hall Haynes, NFL defensive back and halfback for Washington Redskins and Los Angeles Rams
 Jerry Hennessy, NFL defensive end for Chicago Cardinals and Washington Redskins
 John Hock, NFL offensive guard and offensive tackle for Chicago Cardinals and Los Angeles Rams
 Gary Hoffman, NFL offensive tackle for Green Bay Packers and San Francisco 49ers
 Brent Jones, NFL tight end for San Francisco 49ers, 4-time Pro Bowler, 3-time World Champion, CBS NFL analyst
 Jim Leonard, NFL center and offensive guard for San Francisco 49ers and San Diego Chargers
 Bill McPherson, San Francisco 49ers Former Assistant Head Coach
 Gern Nagler, NFL end for Chicago Cardinals, Pittsburgh Steelers and Cleveland Browns
 John Nolan, NFL offensive guard for Los Angeles Buccaneers
 Dan Pastorini, NFL Quarterback for Houston Oilers, Oakland Raiders, Los Angeles Rams and Philadelphia Eagles, Pro Bowl football player for the Houston Oilers
 Jason Tarver, current Oakland Raiders defensive coordinator

Soccer
 Jordan Angeli, professional soccer player, member of the United States women's national soccer team, and Women's Professional Soccer player for Boston Breakers
 Jalil Anibaba, professional soccer player, former member of the United States Under 20 and United States Under 18 national teams, player for the Houston Dynamo
 Miguel Avila, professional soccer player and referee
 Mehdi Ballouchy, professional soccer player, Major League Soccer player for New York Red Bulls
 Kylie Bivens, professional soccer player, former member of the United States women's national soccer team
 Kiki Bosio, professional soccer player, member of the United States women's national soccer team, and Women's Professional Soccer player for FC Gold Pride
 Paul Bravo, professional soccer player, former member of the United States men's national soccer team, and Technical Director for the Colorado Rapids
 Joe Cannon, professional soccer player, member of US men's national team, Major League Soccer player for Vancouver Whitecaps FC, two-time MLS Goalkeeper of the Year Award Winner
 Brandi Chastain, professional soccer player, two-time World Cup winner with US women's national team, member of United States women's national soccer team
 Ryan Cochrane, professional soccer player, member of US men's national team, Major League Soccer player for the San Jose Earthquakes
 Steve Cronin, professional soccer player, member of US men's national team, Major League Soccer goalie for the Los Angeles Galaxy and Major League Soccer Cup Champion
 Marian Dalmy, professional soccer player, member of the United States women's national soccer team, and Women's Professional Soccer player for Chicago Red Stars
 Rick Davis, professional soccer player, former captain and member of the United States men's national soccer team and member of the National Soccer Hall of Fame
 Eric Denton, professional soccer player, Major League Soccer player for the Colorado Rapids
 Bianca Henninger, professional soccer player, member of Mexican women's national soccer team
 Sofia Huerta, member of Mexico women's national football team
 Amaechi Igwe, professional soccer player, member of US men's national team, player for the SV Babelsberg 03 in Germany
 Chioma Igwe, professional soccer player, member of United States women's national soccer team, and player for Freiburg in Germany
 Brittany Klein, professional soccer player, member of United States women's national soccer team
 Peter Lowry, professional soccer player, Major League Soccer player for the Chicago Fire
 Meagan McCray, professional soccer player, member of the United States women's national soccer team, and player for Valur of Úrvalsdeild in Iceland
 Leslie Osborne, professional soccer player, member of the United States women's national soccer team, and Women's Professional Soccer player for Boston Breakers
 Amanda Poach, member of United States women's national soccer team
 Cam Rast, former captain of 1989 NCAA championship Broncos soccer team; two-time first team All American, member of 1992 Olympic team, Executive member of Board of Directors of U.S. Soccer Federation, advisor to the U.S. Olympic committee and current head coach of SCU men's soccer team
 Katherine Reynolds, professional soccer player, member of the United States women's national soccer team, and Women's Professional Soccer player for Atlanta Beat
 Jamil Roberts, professional soccer player, member of US men's national team, Major League Soccer player for the San Jose Earthquakes
 Jeff Stewart, professional soccer player, Major League Soccer player for the Colorado Rapids
 Aly Wagner, professional soccer player, Olympic Gold Medalist (Women's Soccer), member of United States women's national soccer team and Major League Soccerplayer for LA Sol
 Jamil Walker, professional soccer player, Major League Soccer player for D.C. United
 Julie Ertz, United States Women's National soccer team, and Chicago Red Stars of the NWSL.

Other athletics
 Bill Duffy (1982), president and CEO of BDA Sports Management (sports agent)
 Mary McConneloug, Olympic cyclist, and two-time silver medal winner in Pan American Games Cross-Country, 2003 Santo Domingo, 2007 Rio de Janeiro
 Ron Reis, professional wrestler
 Jim Wiechers, PGA Tour golfer
Rudolph Scholz, Olympic Gold medalist in rugby 1920 and 1924
James Fitzpatrick, Olympic Gold medalist in rugby in 1920 
John Muldoon, Olympic Gold medalist in rugby in 1920 and 1924
John O'Neil, Olympic Gold medalist in rugby in 1920 and 1924
Caesar Mannelli, Olympic Gold medalist in rugby in 1924
Hugh Cunningham, Olympic Gold medalist in rugby in 1924
Cathy Jamison, Olympic swimmer in 1968

Notable faculty

 Joseph Bayma, S.J., philosopher and mathematician
Catherine Bell, religious studies scholar
Yaron Brook, President and executive director of the Ayn Rand Institute
 Michael J. Buckley, theologian
 Donald Chisum, legal scholar (patents), author of the Iiconic Chisum on Patents
 Eric Goldman, legal scholar (technology and law), legal blogger
 Paul Halmos (1906–2006), mathematician
 Ron Hansen, novelist
 Bernard R. Hubbard, S.J., "Glacier Priest", explorer and filmmaker
 Francisco Jiménez, Mexican-American author

 Dale G. Larson, psychologist, Professor of Counseling Psychology and Fellow in the American Psychological Association
 John J. Montgomery (1858–1911), aviation pioneer 
 Francine Patterson, Professor of Psychology
 Thomas G. Plante, psychologist, commentator on clergy abuse
 George Schoener (1864–1941), botanist
 Hersh Shefrin, scholar, pioneer in behavioral finance theory
 Shannon Vallor, philosopher of technology

References
https://web.archive.org/web/20100527200826/http://www.scu.edu/about/alumni/notable.cfm
https://web.archive.org/web/20120426010144/http://law.scu.edu/lawyerswholead/list-of-leaders.cfm

Lists of people by university or college in California